Kirkmichael, is a locality, and parish in Dumfries and Galloway, Scotland.

Kirkmichael House, now know the Barony is located within the locality.

References
Lewis, Samuel A., A Topographical Dictionary of Scotland (1846), pp. 98-121.

Parishes in Dumfries and Galloway